Pedro Concepción was a Filipino lawyer and was the first chairman of the Philippine election commission, the COMELEC.

COMELEC
On August 22, 1940, the National Assembly moved for the passage of Commonwealth Act No. 607, a law was already under study seeking the amendment of the 1935 Constitution to clothe the Commission with “constitutional” status. Thus was born the first COMELEC with lawyer Pedro Concepcion as the first chairman and José Abreu and Rufino Luna as members. There were only 39 employees then – a number that would expand to some 5,301 in the next 66 years. The law vested in it the same powers which it would have under the amended 1935 Constitution.

Notes

External links
Comelec Wordpress

External links
Supreme Court E-Library: Memorabilia Room

20th-century Filipino judges
Chairpersons of the Commission on Elections of the Philippines
Possibly living people
Year of birth missing
Quezon administration personnel
Associate Justices of the Supreme Court of the Philippines